Frederick Lewis Schuman (1904–1981) was an American professor of history, political science and international relations at Williams College.

Career
Schuman was a professor of history at University of Chicago and then for 32 years at Williams College.  He analyzed international relations and social science, focusing on the period between World War I and World War II.

In 1932, amid the Great Depression and widespread disillusionment about capitalism's prospects, Schuman had signed an open letter supporting the League of Professional Groups for Foster and Ford, candidates of the Communist Party of the United States in that year's Presidential election. In a 1936 article titled "Liberalism and Communism Reconsidered" he sought to reconcile liberal and Marxist viewpoints, arguing both had common interests against fascism. Despite such activity, however, Schuman later wrote that "the major premises of Marxism, viewed in retrospect, are demonstrably false... No civilized society has ever been, or can ever be, 'classless' or 'stateless.' Total socialism, where achieved, thus far resembles Aldous Huxley's Brave New World or George Orwell's 1984 far more than Plato's perfect polity or Sir Thomas More's Utopia."

On the night of December 7, 1941, Schuman told an audience at the Ford Hall Forum, "The Nazis, Fascists, and Japanese have made one tragic blunder. They allowed themselves to believe that the work of disintegration in America had gone far enough for them to strike. They're wrong." He also said that the United States should lead "a new world order and world unity." He urged recognition of the Free French and aid to governments-in-exile in overthrowing quisling regimes, leading toward the overthrow of Hitler. He predicted that Japan could fight for only three or four months.

Schuman came under attack by the House Un-American Activities Committee in 1943 as having a record of "Communist affiliations." Schuman denied the accusations and successfully withstood efforts by the committee to have him removed as a government analyst of German radio broadcasts, a post that he held for several months in 1942 and 1943 while he was on leave from Williams. Many vocal critics, including several Williams alumni, objected to the professor's outspoken liberalism, suspected communism, and continued to call for Schuman's dismissal throughout the rest of his career at the college.  

In a 1945 American Political Science Review article, Schuman criticized notions that a new collective security organization could contribute to world peace. Schuman pointed to examples from history of collective security organizations that failed to facilitate world peace. He argued that the organization that would become the United Nations could only facilitate world peace if the United States, the Soviet Union, and the United Kingdom worked in unison, but that the organization would fail if there were divisions between the three powers.

Schuman came under attack again by Senator Joseph R. McCarthy in 1953.  

In his 1953 book Techniques of Communism, ex-communist and FBI-paid informant Louis Budenz wrote a subsection on Schuman in a chapter on "Affecting Public Opinion." Budenz asserted that Schuman was a CPUSA member in the 1930s and 1940s.  Citing Eugene Lyons' 1941 book Red Decade, Budenz asserted that Schuman had supported CPUSA head William Z. Foster's bid for the US presidency (1932), traveled to and lectured in the USSR (1933-4), extolled US-USSR friendship at a Carnegie Hall gala (1936), called for closer Soviet ties in an open letter in the Daily Worker (1939), and supported alleged Soviet spy Gerhart Eisler (1946).  He cites several books by Schuman as being subversive:  American Policy Toward Russia Since 1917, American Politics at Home and Abroad (error for Soviet Politics at Home and Abroad?), and The Commonwealth of Man.  He also list "Communist fronts" to which Schuman belong.  In sum, Budenz claimed, Schuman had "done tremendous damage" to the US.  (Budenz also notes that Schuman had attacked ex-communists who had testified for the US government, "particularly Whittaker Chambers, Louis Budenz, and Elizabeth Bentley.")

In the 1960s, Schuman undertook several, very public political and social battles at Williams, including his much-publicized refusal to attend ceremonies during a visit from Lady Bird Johnson, which he considered to be the college's tacit indication of support for the Johnson Administration's involvement in the Vietnam War.

Legacy
The term "geo-strategy" was first used by Schuman in his 1942 article "Let Us Learn Our Geopolitics." It was a translation of the German term Wehrgeopolitik, as used by the German geostrategist Karl Haushofer. Previous translations had been attempted, such as "defense-geopolitics." Robert Strausz-Hupé had coined and popularized "war geopolitics" as another alternate translation.

Works

Schuman's 1946 book Soviet Politics At Home and Abroad was criticised by Dwight Macdonald as "a neo-Stalinist survey, that is, its author admits practically everything and justifies it in turgid surges of clotted prose as necessary and even praise-worthy". A more positive review stated, "To those who do not share the outlook of a particular author, his  convictions are apt to appear biased or prejudiced, and Professor Schuman is not likely to escape criticisms on that score. None the less, he has made an earnest attempt at a balanced and temperate account of Soviet development, and has achieved a very considerable measure of success." Marshall D. Shulman, the Columbia University professor who was the Carter Administration's leading expert on the Soviet Union, recalled using the book for a class he taught at City College of New York in the late 1940s.

Schuman's 1957 book Russia Since 1917 (which was in some ways an updated version of Soviet Politics At Home and Abroad) was described by Kirkus Reviews as "a compendium, elaborately researched and as fairminded as anyone could reasonably desire." The International Socialist Review accused the author of having "no understanding of Marxism" and of a "vilification of Trotsky and the  Left Opposition," but considered certain other aspects of the book to be valuable and claimed Schuman's argument that "the double-crossing and chicanery of Allied diplomacy was due to the hope that the 'Fascist Triplice' would save 'civilization' from Bolshevism, is ironclad."

Books
 
 
 
  
 
 
 
 
 
 
  (kirja-arvio)

References

External links
Frederick Lewis Schuman papers at Williams College Archives & Special Collections 

1904 births
1981 deaths
American military historians
American political scientists
Historians of Europe
American international relations scholars
Williams College faculty
20th-century American historians
20th-century American male writers
American male non-fiction writers
20th-century political scientists